The 2 Worlds 2 Voices Tour was a co-headlining concert tour by American recording artists Reba McEntire and Kelly Clarkson that took place in two segments during 2008.  The tour only visited North America. The tour's shows featured the two singers sharing the same band and stage and performing each other's songs.

Background
Deemed  "one of pop music's most curious couplings" by USA Today – the tour involving the cross-genre, cross-generational pairing came about as a consequence of Clarkson's career battles surrounding the release of her June 2007 My December album.  Clarkson left her previous management, The Firm, Inc., and joined a management company headed by McEntire's husband, Narvel Blackstock.  The two teamed up together for McEntire's Reba: Duets album, released in September 2007,  as well as on the television program CMT Crossroads, in the process, discovering "a spark between the two" of them.

It was rumored in October 2007, by one of McEntire's band members that the two singers would tour together and the first date was confirmed on November 14, 2007 by West Virginia station WTRF-TV. The tour was officially announced on November 15.

The tour's dates took place in between legs of Clarkson's My December Tour. Unlike that tour, on 2 Worlds 2 Voices Clarkson avoided material from My December, performing only two songs from it. The first leg of the tour proved to be an overwhelming success, selling out all fifteen shows and grossing over US$7 million, and performing to over 400,000 people.

On May 15, dates for a September to November leg of the tour were confirmed by both Clarkson's and McEntire's websites.

Opening act
 Melissa Peterman

Setlist

{{hidden
| headercss = background: #ccccff; font-size: 100%; width: 59%;
| contentcss = text-align: left; font-size: 100%; width: 75%;
| header = Leg 1
| content = January 17 – February 16, 2008
"Sweet Dreams" 
"Sweet Dreams (Are Made of This)"
"Why Haven't I Heard from You"
"Walk Away"
"The Night the Lights Went Out in Georgia" 
"Behind These Hazel Eyes" 
"The Fear of Being Alone"
"Beautiful Disaster"
"Sleeping with the Telephone" 
"Miss Independent" 
"The Greatest Man I Never Knew"
"Cathy's Clown"
"Up to the Mountain"
Medley: "How Blue" / "One Promise Too Late"
"Be Still"
"Love Revival"
"Never Again" 
"And Still" 
"Breakaway"
"Does He Love You"
"Is There Life Out There" 
"I'm a Survivor" 
"A Moment Like This"
Encore
"Since U Been Gone"
"Because of You"
"Fancy"
}}
{{hidden
| headercss = background: #ccccff; font-size: 100%; width: 59%;
| contentcss = text-align: left; font-size: 100%; width: 75%;
| header = Leg 2
| content = September 25 – November 22, 2008
"Sweet Dreams" 
"Sweet Dreams (Are Made of This)"
"Why Haven't I Heard From You"
"Walk Away"
"The Night the Lights Went Out in Georgia" 
"Behind These Hazel Eyes" 
"The Fear of Being Alone"
"Beautiful Disaster"
"Why Not Tonight" 
"Stuff Like That There" 
"Miss Independent" 
"The Greatest Man I Never Knew"
"Cathy's Clown"
"Up to the Mountain"
Medley: "How Blue" / "One Promise Too Late"
"Be Still"
"Love Revival"
"Never Again" 
"And Still" 
"Breakaway"
"Does He Love You"
"Is There Life Out There" 
"I'm a Survivor" 
"A Moment Like This"
Encore
"Since U Been Gone"
"Because of You"
"Fancy"
}}

Tour dates

Box office score data

Critical reception
Overall, the tour received positive reviews throughout its run. Many critics praised McEntire's ability to adapt her country roots into a rock and roll atmosphere. Although McEntire was given the highest praise, many admired Clarkson's ability to stand her ground amongst music's biggest legends. However, one critic noted Clarkson's awe of McEntire, writing that at times she seemed a bit star struck. The critic went on to state: "McEntire exhibited a honed mastery of the material – be it Clarkson's or her own – and a professional command of the stage. Clarkson will undoubtedly learn a lot in the coming month." Brian Dukes of the Fayetteville Observer wrote: "When the pair teamed up on Clarkson's "Beautiful Disaster", there was no question why McEntire and Clarkson had toured together. A better question would be: "Why did they wait so long?", while Craig Shelbrune from CMT wrote, "...2 Worlds, 2 Voices is likely to go down as one of McEntire's most memorable tours."

References

2008 concert tours
Co-headlining concert tours
Kelly Clarkson concert tours
Reba McEntire concert tours